The 2012 Dubai World Cup was a horse race held at Meydan Racecourse on Saturday 31 March 2012. It was the 17th running of the Dubai World Cup.

The winner was Godolphin's Monterosso, a five-year-old bay entire horse trained in Dubai by Mahmood Al Zarooni and ridden by Mickael Barzalona. Monterosso's victory was the first in the race for his jockey and trainer and the fifth for Godolphin.

Monterosso had been trained in England by Mark Johnston in 2009 and 2010, winning five races including the King Edward VII Stakes at Royal Ascot. In 2011 he was transferred to the Godolphin stable and sent to compete in Dubai where he won the Dubai City of Gold and finished third to Victoire Pisa in the Dubai World Cup. In the 2012 World Cup he started a 20/1 outsider and won by three lengths from his more fancied stable companion Capponi with the British-trained Planteur half a length back in third. The 5/4 favourite So You Think finished fourth of the thirteen runners.

Race details
 Sponsor: Emirates Airline
 Purse: £6,451,613; First prize: £3,870,968
 Surface: Tapeta
 Going: Standard
 Distance: 10 furlongs
 Number of runners: 13
 Winner's time: 2:02.67

Full result

 Abbreviations: nse = nose; nk = neck; shd = head; hd = head

Winner's details
Further details of the winner, Monterosso
 Sex: Stallion
 Foaled: 14 February 2007
 Country: United Kingdom
 Sire: Dubawi; Dam: Porto Roca (Barathea)
 Owner: Godolphin
 Breeder: Darley Stud

References

Dubai World Cup
Dubai World Cup
Dubai World Cup
Dubai World Cup